Marlin Darrah is the executive director of International Film & Video (IFV), a production company based in the United States.  Darrah is one of the most widely traveled filmmakers in the world.  For his documentary work in Portugal and in other locations throughout the world, Darrah was recently honored with a knighthood in the Royal House of Portugal.

From 1976 through 2015, Darrah produced several dozen documentaries, travel-adventure films and feature films in more than 140 countries.

Darrah's company, IFV, maintains a stock library of original worldwide footage. Darrah's international high-definition shots have been purchased by producers in the television industry and by educational organizations for either limited-use or royalty-free licensing purposes.

Production summary

Marathon, Darrah's first 16mm film, examined the drama of the 1976 Olympic Trials Marathon in Eugene, Oregon. The film was licensed and distributed nationally from 1977-1980 by Runner's World magazine in San Francisco. For three years, Marlin produced several films for the magazine, one of which, Moments of the Runner, was a finalist in the 1979 American Film Festival in NYC. For that film, Darrah shot footage throughout the U.S., as well as in Moscow, and at the site of the first Olympic Games in Greece.

In addition to his work with Runner's World, Darrah also produced and shot in 1977 Nike, Inc.'s first film, a 23-minute program called Running Peace.

From 1982-2006, Darrah shot and directed documentaries and travel programs in more than 140 countries worldwide. His shots or programs have been sold or shown by National Geographic Society, PBS, CBS, NBC, ABC, CNN, Discovery Channel, and History Channel.

Darrah made promotional travel video programs for such companies as:
Nature Expeditions International, Exploration Cruise Lines, Royal Viking Line, Holland America, International Expeditions, TRAVCOA, Cultural Folk Tours International, TraveLearn, Eco-Expeditions, World Explorer Cruises, Varig Brazilian Airlines, Garuda Airlines, Federal Express, Lost World Adventures, and the American Institute For Foreign Study (AIFS).

The University of Virginia's Semester at Sea study-abroad program contracted Darrah from 1989 through 2008 to produce approximately 40 two-hour video programs, documenting the around-the-world voyages of Semester at Sea.   More than 100,000 of Darrah's Semester at Sea DVDs were distributed to students and families throughout the U.S.

In 2000, Darrah completed a 7-part, 7-hour DVD series entitled World's Most Exotic Places. Profiled in that DVD series are Central and South America, New Guinea, Asia, the Middle East, Africa and Europe. EDI/Marathon, Inc. of Oregon distributed 20,000+ copies of the series throughout North America to libraries and through direct DVD sales to the public.

In 2002, Darrah joined fellow filmmaker Gregory Ritchie and traveled to NW Pakistan for five weeks to direct and shoot a documentary about the challenging lives of the Pashtun villagers living in the Tribal Zone along the border of Afghanistan and Pakistan.  The 55-minute documentary, In the Shadow of bin Laden, was selected for screenings at several film festivals and has been shown in theaters throughout the United States.

Darrah also co-wrote, directed, and co-produced in Southeast Asia a dramatic feature-length movie, Monsoon Wife. The movie was completed in September 2002. The movie is about love, betrayal, and redemption in exotic and almost lawless Cambodia. Monsoon Wife is the first American-produced feature film to be shot entirely in Cambodia. Domestic rights for the movie were acquired by Universal Pictures and Netflix and other internet distributors continue to make the movie available to the public. In addition, a dozen countries have acquired television and DVD rights to the movie.

In 2005 Darrah directed and shot an HD documentary feature in Egypt, Jesus, The Lost Years for Sakkara Productions. The documentary was based on N.Y. Times best-selling author Paul Perry's book Jesus in Egypt and it premiered at the Cairo Opera House to members of the Mubarak family and more than 1500 others, including Egyptian cabinet members, ambassadors and Saudi princes. Mrs. Mubarak expressed great admiration for the film in the Egyptian press, and admitted that it showed "an Egypt I have never seen." She agreed to let the film be sold in Egypt under the condition that the name of Jesus not appear in the title to avoid inflaming Muslim radicals. As a result the film was released in the Middle East under the title The Holy Family in Egypt.

Paul Perry/Sakkara Productions of Arizona contracted Darrah from 1995-2015 as director of photography and to assist in the co-production of several documentaries: Saved by the Light (1996); Painting the Paradox (1997); Visions and Miracles (2009); Afterlife (2010); Dali's Greatest Secret (2012); Glimpses of Eternity and Secret Mummies of Lisbon (both currently in production - 2015).

From 2008-2019, Darrah shot and produced twelve 90-minute travel adventure video programs. In the last nine years, Darrah has presented these travel features to audiences and organizations around the country such as the Harvard Club of Boston, the Union Club of NYC and the Geographical Society of Philadelphia.
His current travel video features include: The Great Silk Road (2011); Pearls of the Caribbean (2015); Mediterranean Dream (2015); Cuba (2011); Madagascar (2013); Southeast Asia (2015); The Amazon (2014); Central and South America (2010); Pakistan and Afghanistan (2010); Northern Europe (2011); Cities of Italy (2011); Voyage Down the Nile (2015) and Southern Europe.

Darrah traveled to Madagascar in 2012 to produce and shoot an HD travel-documentary feature about the unique people and wildlife of the country as well as tell the swashbuckling story of the hundreds of 18th-century pirates that used Madagascar as a base of operations for piracy and other nefarious activities in the Indian Ocean.  The completed 80-minute program has been screened at auditoriums and theaters throughout the U.S.

In 2012, the National Center for Civil and Human Rights in Atlanta used a number of Darrah's shots of international children for the making of their official opening ceremony video presentation. 

Darrah also works with Princess Cruises and with Silversea Cruises of Ft. Lauderdale, presenting lectures and his travel programs aboard their ships.

Darrah is also a recent recipient of the Burton Holmes Award for "best travel programs," given by his peers in the travel-adventure features industry.

In 2020, Darrah wrote, produced and directed the thriller, "Amazon Queen," a movie shot entirely in Brazil.  New York Times author Paul Perry has described the movie as "Romantic, thrilling and exotic, this movie grabs hold and won't let you go.  Independent filmmaking at its best."  Vision Films is the worldwide distributor of "Amazon Queen."

When not out of the country on assignment, Darrah lives in Los Angeles with his wife, producer Lin Zuo.  His daughter Maya McDarragh is an artist living in Montreal.

Awards

For Darrah's 85-minute movie thriller, "Amazon Queen," the following film festival awards:

“Best Film”  -  Barcelona International Film Festival  (2021)

“Best Thriller”   -   Berlin International Art Film Festival  (July 2021)

"Best International Narrative Feature"  -  New York Independent Cinema Awards (July 2021)

“Best International Feature”  -  Toronto Independent Film Festival   (May 2021)

“Best Feature Film” & “Best Director”  -  Silk Road Film Awards Cannes  (May 2021)

“Best Feature Film” & “Best Director”  -  New York Movie Awards  (June 2021)

“Best Indie Feature” & “Best Director” -  Istanbul Film Awards   (May 2021)

“Best Indie Film”  -  Miami Indie Film Awards  (June 2021)

“Best Action Feature” & “Best Director” & "Best Producers" & "Best Acting Ensemble" & "Best Actor" & "Best Actress" & "Best Supporting Actor" & "Best Supporting Actress" & "Best Young Actor" & "Best Trailer" & "Best Sound Design"  - Rome International Movie Awards  (June 2021)                                                                                   

“Best U.S. Feature Film”  -  Channel Islands International Film Awards  (California - 2021)

“Best Feature Film”  -  Argenteuil International Film Festival  (June 2021)

“Best Feature Film”  -  Naples Film Awards   (June 2021)

“Best Sound Design”  -  Paris International Film Awards  (June 2021)

“Best Narrative Feature”  -  L’Age d’Or International Film Festival – India  (July 2021) 

“Best International Feature Film”  -  Port Blair International Film Festival - India (July 2021)

“Best Director”  -  Port Blair International Film Festival  - India  (July 2021)

“Best Narrative Feature Film” -  Gangtok International Film Festival - India  (July 2021)

“Award of Merit, Special Mention" – Direction  -  IndieFEST  San Diego  (July 2021)

“Award of Merit, Special Mention" – Feature Film  -  IndieFEST  San Diego  (July 2021)

“Best Director” & “Best Actress”  & “Best Sound Design”  – GRALHA (Brazil) International Film Awards (July 2021)

“Best Feature Film”  -  San Pedro International Film Festival  (L.A. - 2021)  

“Best Action Feature Film” & “Best Supporting Actor” & “Best Cinematography”  - Eastern Europe International Movie Awards  (July 2021) 

“Best International Feature Film”  -  Indo French International Film Festival, India  (July 2021)

“Best Director, International Feature Film”  -  Indo French International Film Festival, India (July 2021)

“Best Feature Film” - Philip D’Antoni Award  - New York City Film & Television Festival  (August 2021) 

“Honorable Mention Award”  -  France International Film Festival  (2021)

“Best Narrative Feature” -  Singapore World Film Festival   (August 2021)

“Best Feature Film”  -  Washington Film Festival  (2021) 

“Best Film”  -  Prague International Film Festival  (Fall 2021)

“Best Director”  -   Prague International Film Festival  (Fall 2021)

“Best Feature Film”  -  Boden Sweden International Film Festival  (August 2021)

“Best Drama”  -  Stockholm City Film Festival   (August 2021)

“Outstanding Achievement Award" for Narrative Feature - Tagore International Film Festival  (India – Aug 2021)

“Best Director”  -  Anatolia International Film Festival   (Turkey)

“Outstanding Director”   -  Palm Beach Film Festival  (2021)

“Outstanding Actor” (Nick Dreselly Thomas)   -  Palm Beach Film Festival  (2021)

“Best Cinematography”   - Silicon Beach International Film Festival  (Los Angeles - 2021)

“Best Production”  -  Continental Film Festival  (Munich - 2021)

“Best International Feature Film”  -  United States Film Festival  (for 2nd half of 2021)

“Best Thriller”   &  “Best Cinematographer”  -  Las Vegas International Film Festival (2021)

Burton Holmes Award for Best Travel Film Showcase at the 2009 Travel Adventure Cinema Society Convention in Chicago

For Darrah’s 100-minute dramatic movie, Monsoon Wife, the following awards and honors at these festivals:

1) Sarasota International Film Festival: Winner, Producer's Choice for Best Feature

2) Rome International Film Festival: Finalist

3) Sedona International Film Festival: Finalist

4) Phoenix-Scottsdale International Film Fest: Winner, Best of Fest and Best Feature Film

5) New York International Independent Film Festival: Finalist

6) Spokane-Northwest International Film Festival: Winner, Best Film, Best Director

7) Portland Cascade Film Festival: Winner, Best Feature Film/Best Social Justice Expose

8) Newport Beach Film Festival: Winner, Best Dramatic Film

9) Whistler International Film Festival: Finalist

10) Wine Country International Film Festival: Finalist

Darrah won Best Sports Film at the 1979 American Film Festival in NYC, for his film, Moments of the Runner

References

American directors
American filmmakers
Year of birth missing (living people)
Living people